Robert Grant (born 1 July 1990) is an English semi-professional footballer who plays as a striker. He is currently player-manager at Northern Premier League Premier Division side Radcliffe.

Playing

Accrington Stanley
Born in Liverpool, Merseyside, Grant came through Accrington Stanley's youth system and made his first team on 5 May 2007 in the League Two clash with Milton Keynes Dons at the National Hockey Stadium which ended in 3–1 defeat for Stanley. In that game, at the age of 16 years 309 days, he became the second youngest player to appear in The Football League for Stanley and the youngest since February 1959. At the beginning of the 2007–08 season he suffered a knee injury which kept him out until January 2008, soon after he signed professional terms. His first goal for Stanley came in a 1–0 home win against Chesterfield on 25 April 2009.

Scunthorpe United
On 24 June 2010 Grant signed for Scunthorpe United for the fee up to £260,000 and signed a two-year deal at the club.
He was awarded a one-year contract extension by the club in May 2012.

Rochdale
In the summer of 2012 Grant signed a two-year deal at Rochdale for an undisclosed fee and rejoined John Coleman who was his manager while he was at Accrington Stanley.
On 17 June 2013 Grant had a transfer request accepted by Rochdale after a successful season at Spotland in which he scored 16 goals from 28 appearances.

Blackpool
On 18 July 2013, Grant signed for Blackpool for an undisclosed fee, on a two-year contract with an option of a further year. He was released in May 2015.

Fleetwood Town (loan)
On 28 February 2014, Grant joined League Two side Fleetwood Town for the remainder of the 2013–14 season but was injured 38 minutes into his debut.

Shrewsbury Town (loan)
Having not featured for his parent club since December 2013, Grant signed on an initial one-month loan with Shrewsbury Town in League Two on 9 October 2014, linking up with former Blackpool teammates James Caton and Mark Halstead. He made his debut a week later, playing an hour as Shrewsbury picked up their first away win of the season against York City. His loan was later extended until the New Year, and he scored his first goal for the club in a 2–0 home win over Mansfield Town on 15 November. Grant made a brief return Blackpool in January 2015, before extending his loan period at Shrewsbury to the end of the 2014–15 season.

After scoring a brace in two matches – in a 2–1 away win at his former club Accrington, and also in Shrewsbury's first ever win at Fratton Park against Portsmouth, as well as a further goal against Cambridge United, Grant won the Football League Two Player of the Month award for March 2015.

Having featured regularly as the club were promoted back to League One at the first attempt, Grant subsequently returned to Blackpool at the end of the season, although he expressed his interest in a permanent transfer to Shrewsbury should the opportunity arise.

Return to Fleetwood Town

After being released by Blackpool, Grant rejoined Fleetwood Town on a two-year deal in July 2015. He signed a two-year contract extension in March 2017.

Wrexham

On 24 November 2018, Grant joined Wrexham on a short-term loan until January 2019.
Bobby Grant made his short-term loan permanent on 2 January 2019.

Return to Accrington Stanley (loan)

Grant stepped up two divisions on 31 January 2020 to re-join Accrington Stanley on a six-month loan.

Loan to Oldham Athletic

On 10 August 2020, it was announced that Grant had joined Oldham Athletic on a season-long loan. He scored on his debut for Oldham in a 3-0 EFL Cup win over Carlisle United on 5 September 2020.

Radcliffe
On 27 June 2021, Grant took a player-coach role at Radcliffe following his release from Wrexham.

On 7 October, Radcliffe announced that Grant would be taking over first-team managerial duties until further notice, following the sacking of Lee Fowler.

Style of play
Grant is able to play as a striker, but has often been utilised as an attacking midfielder or winger. He is left footed, and known for his ability to shoot accurately from distance.

Career statistics

Managerial statistics

Honours
Shrewsbury Town
League Two runner-up: 2014–15

Individual

Football League Two Player of the Month: March 2015

References

External links

1990 births
Living people
Footballers from Liverpool
English footballers
Association football forwards
Accrington Stanley F.C. players
Scunthorpe United F.C. players
Rochdale A.F.C. players
Blackpool F.C. players
Fleetwood Town F.C. players
Shrewsbury Town F.C. players
Wrexham A.F.C. players
Oldham Athletic A.F.C. players
Radcliffe F.C. players
English Football League players
National League (English football) players
Northern Premier League players
Radcliffe F.C. managers
Northern Premier League managers
English football managers